An Châu is a township and capital of Châu Thành District in An Giang Province, Vietnam.

References

Communes of An Giang province
Populated places in An Giang province
District capitals in Vietnam
Townships in Vietnam